The South African Army Artillery Formation is the controlling entity of all South African Army artillery units. It draws much of its history from the South African Artillery, established in 1934 but with roots that reach back to 1921. The formation consists of both regular and reserve units. There is a separate South African Army Air Defence Artillery Formation that directs army anti-aircraft warfare units.

History

Origins
The South African Permanent Force, created in 1913 as the Permanent Force and re-designated with effect from 23 February 1923, included the South African Field Artillery (SAFA), and the South African Permanent Garrison Artillery (SAPGA). The SAPGA had begun operations some time before, when the coastal defences of the Cape Peninsula (manned by the Cape Garrison Artillery) had been handed over to South Africa in December 1921.

In Proclamation No. 246 of 1934, the Governor General of the Union of South Africa merged the two organisations with effect from 1 September 1934 and created one Corps titled the South African Artillery (SAA) (see South African Army corps and branches).

World War 2
Nine field regiments, two medium regiments, and three anti-tank regiments served in North Africa and Italy during the Second World War.

1st Medium Regiment SAA (SAHA) was formed briefly from 1 October 1939 - July 1941, when it was broken up in Egypt to provide replacements for the field regiments of the SAA. It was reformed with headquarters at Cape Town from 1 January 1946. It was transferred from Cape Town and out of Cape Command to Oudtshoorn from 31 December 1953, but was then disbanded after a Citizen Force reorganisation on 1 March 1960.

Post World War 2
From 1 July 1951 8 Field Regiment SAA was active, but was redesignated the Johannesburg Regiment in 1960.

Bush War period
10 Artillery Brigade South Africa, was active with 4 and 14 Regiments since 1983, and 14 Artillery Regiment disbanded on January 1, 1993.

National Defence Force Reorganisation
The army's reorganisation after the creation of the new South African National Defence Force was lengthy. The SA Army Office was established. The Corps were restructured with Regular and Reserve Regiments under command. The so-called “Type Formations” were established which assumed responsibility for the provisioning of combat-ready forces to be employed under the direction of Joint Operations Division.

Air Defence Artillery becomes a separate formation
 In 1997 the 7th Light Anti-Aircraft Regiment, active since the 1960s, was disestablished.
 Regiment Overvaal (ROV) which was established on 1 April 1969 as an Anti-Aircraft Regiment based on Vereeniging Military Base in Vereeniging. P Battery of Regiment Vaalrivier was transferred on 1 October 1969 to form 8th Light Anti-Aircraft Regiment (8LLA). The name changed from 8LLA to ROV on 27 April 1993. The regiment was disestablished in  1997.

The Artillery Formation
The South African Artillery re-organised itself into the South African Army Artillery Formation, directed by the SA Army
Artillery Formation Headquarters.
The South African Army Artillery Formation HQ was established in April 1999.

Regional Co-operation
In the annual report for the 2013-14 fiscal year, the SANDF reported the development of artillery cooperation and the establishment of the Namibian Army School of Artillery. The SA Army assisted the Namibian Defence Force with the development of courses and ultimately the establishment of the Namibian School of Artillery.

Regular units
 School of Artillery
 4 Artillery Regiment (Composite Regiment) (Potchefstroom)
 Artillery Mobilisation Regiment

Reserve units

 Nelson Mandela Artillery Regiment - equipped with G5 155mm towed howitzers, Cape Town
 General Dan Pienaar Artillery Regiment - equipped with G5 155mm towed howitzers, Kroonstad
 King Cetshwayo Artillery Regiment - equipped with G6 155mm self-propelled howitzers, Durban
 Sandfontein Artillery Regiment - equipped with G6 155mm self-propelled howitzers, Johannesburg
 State Artillery Regiment - equipped with Bateleur 127mm MLRS, Pretoria
 Regiment Potchefstroom Universiteit - equipped with Bateleur 127mm MLRS, Potchefstroom
 Steve Biko Artillery Regiment - equipped with 120mm mortars, Pretoria (Airborne unit that supports 44 Parachute Regiment)

Equipment
The Formation uses the following equipment, among others:

 GV6 155 mm self-propelled howitzer (43)
 GV5 155 mm howitzer (75) replaced the G4 155 mm gun and the G2 140 mm gun
 Bateleur 127 mm 40 tube self-propelled multiple rocket launcher (25)
 1 Battery of ATE Vulture Tactical Unmanned Air Vehicles for daytime reconnaissance and artillery spotting
 M5 120mm air deployable mortar

To be acquired:

 G7 lightweight 105 mm gun still under development by Denel Land Systems

Conventional Artillery

Cannon

Multiple Rocket Launcher Systems

References

 Further reading:

External links
 Defenceweb fact file
 Gunner's Association

Artillery units and formations of South Africa